Davies Phiri (born 1 April 1976 in Mufulira) is a former Zambian football (soccer) goalkeeper who is currently the goalkeeper coach for Durban based football team, AmaZulu F.C. He previously played for Durban Stars, Golden Arrows and Kabwe Warriors.

As a player he was part of the Zambian 1996 African Cup of Nations squad that lost in the semi-finals to Tunisia 4–2. He was a member of the 1998 African Cup of Nations squad, that finished third in group D on 4 points; the 2000 African Nations Cup team, who finished third in group C in the first round of competition; and, part of the 2002 African Cup of Nations squad that finished fourth in Group D on 1 point.

As a coach he was drafted in 2011 into the Zambian technical team to help prepare the squad for the 2012 Africa Cup of Nations. The team went on to win the competition, 8–7 on penalties against Ivory Coast.

Coaching career

Playing career

References

External links

1976 births
Living people
Zambian footballers
Zambian expatriate footballers
People from Mufulira
Association football goalkeepers
1996 African Cup of Nations players
1998 African Cup of Nations players
2000 African Cup of Nations players
2002 African Cup of Nations players
Kabwe Warriors F.C. players
Expatriate soccer players in South Africa
Zambia international footballers
South African Premier Division players
National First Division players
Zambian expatriate sportspeople in South Africa
Durban Stars F.C. players
Lamontville Golden Arrows F.C. players